Eburnamenine is an anticholinergic alkaloid.

External links

Anticholinergic alkaloids
Quinolizidine alkaloids